Arthur Joseph Thibault (February 21, 1914 – February 22, 1983) was a farmer and political figure in Saskatchewan. He represented Kinistino from 1959 to 1971 Co-operative Commonwealth Federation (CCF) member and from 1975 to 1978 as a New Democratic Party (NDP) member and Melfort-Kinistino from 1971 to 1975 as an NDP member in the Legislative Assembly of Saskatchewan.

He was born in Bonne Madone, Saskatchewan, the son of Eugene Thibault and Emma McGary, and went on to farm in the Tarnopol district. He served as reeve of Invergordon, as a member of the local school board and as a member of the Saskatchewan Farmers' Union. In 1941, he married Doris Lepine. Thibault was first elected to the Saskatchewan assembly in a 1959 by-election held following the death of Henry Begrand. From 1978 to 1981, he worked at the St. Louis Alcoholism Rehabilitation Centre in Prince Albert.

Electoral history

|-
 
|style="width: 130px"|CCF
|Arthur Thibault
|align="right"|2,990
|align="right"|47.89%
|align="right"|+2.31

 
|Prog. Conservative
|Harvey Gjesdal
|align="right"|1,597
|align="right"|25.58%
|align="right"|-
|- bgcolor="white"
!align="left" colspan=3|Total
!align="right"|6,243
!align="right"|100.00%
!align="right"|

|-
 
|style="width: 130px"|CCF
|Arthur Thibault
|align="right"|2,731
|align="right"|42.17%
|align="right"|-5.72

 
|Prog. Conservative
|Harvey Gjesdal
|align="right"|994
|align="right"|15.34%
|align="right"|-10.24

|- bgcolor="white"
!align="left" colspan=3|Total
!align="right"|6,477
!align="right"|100.00%
!align="right"|

|-
 
|style="width: 130px"|CCF
|Arthur Thibault
|align="right"|3,334
|align="right"|51.62%
|align="right"|+9.45

|- bgcolor="white"
!align="left" colspan=3|Total
!align="right"|6,459
!align="right"|100.00%
!align="right"|

|-
 
|style="width: 130px"|NDP
|Arthur Thibault
|align="right"|3,260
|align="right"|54.48%
|align="right"|+2.86

|- bgcolor="white"
!align="left" colspan=3|Total
!align="right"|5,984
!align="right"|100.00%
!align="right"|

|-
 
| style="width: 130px"|NDP
|Arthur Thibault
|align="right"|6,103
|align="right"|59.40
|align="right"|–

|- bgcolor="white"
!align="left" colspan=3|Total
!align="right"|10,274
!align="right"|100.00
!align="right"|

|-
 
|style="width: 130px"|NDP
|Arthur Thibault
|align="right"|3,215
|align="right"|44.21%
|align="right"|-

 
|Progressive Conservative
|Tom Smith
|align="right"|1,657
|align="right"|22.79%
|align="right"|-
|- bgcolor="white"
!align="left" colspan=3|Total
!align="right"|7,272
!align="right"|100.00%
!align="right"|

References 

Saskatchewan Co-operative Commonwealth Federation MLAs
20th-century Canadian politicians
Saskatchewan New Democratic Party MLAs
1914 births
1983 deaths
Fransaskois people